Bob Hess (November 10, 1910 – March 16, 1998) was an American wrestler. He competed in the men's freestyle middleweight at the 1932 Summer Olympics.

References

External links
 

1910 births
1998 deaths
American male sport wrestlers
Olympic wrestlers of the United States
Wrestlers at the 1932 Summer Olympics
People from Cresco, Iowa